Karosa was a bus manufacturer in Vysoké Mýto in the Czech Republic. It was the biggest manufacturer of buses in Czechoslovakia. In 2007 its name was changed to Iveco Czech Republic, and now the company produces buses under the name Iveco Bus.

Since 2014, the Czech Republic produced more buses per million inhabitants than any other country in the world. The Iveco Bus factory in Vysoké Mýto produces around 3,100 buses annually and is the largest manufacturer of buses in Europe.

Production of car bodies
In 1896 Josef Sodomka founded a manufacturing plant for coaches -  First East Bohemian manufacture of carriages Josef Sodomka in Vysoké Mýto. In 1925, the Sodomka company started producing automobile bodywork of its own design, designed to be mounted on automobile chassis produced by Praga as the Mignon. In the 1930s, Sodomka became a successful company, winning automotive competitions for elegance and opening showrooms. The company created car bodies for middle-ranked cars, but also for celebrities of the times, for example for Jan Werich on a Tatra 52 chassis and for the wife of President Beneš on an Aero 50 chassis. The company also created automobile bodies for various other Czech and foreign car companies.

Bus production

In 1948, the company was nationalized.  Because the company's name included the owner's name, the company name was changed to that of Oldřich Uhlík in Prague. The company was also incorporated into a 'National Enterprise', which was then given the name Karosa. At this time Karosa became the sole manufacturer of buses in Czechoslovakia, as under central planning other manufacturers such as Škoda or Praga were not allowed to compete. At the end of the 1950s Karosa began to produce the first well-known, popular models of urban buses such as the 706 RTO (for this model, however, Karosa only built the body), which were exhibited at numerous international exhibitions (e.g. Expo 58 in Brussels in the year 1958). This bus was then modified to demonstrate a version for intercity transport and even an articulated version, which it remained only a prototype. The 706 RTO was replaced by Š series in 1964, which was also built as a trolleybus. The factory used today was built in 1972, but the company renovated it recently. In 1981 Karosa introduced the new 700 series.

In 1989, after the fall of the communist regime, Karosa had to adapt to the massive socio-economic changes, and its buses became conceptually underdeveloped. Its production was reduced to only 1,000 buses a year, from 3,400 buses in 1989. Still, Karosa was able to continue in production, mainly due to foreign investment by the French Renault company. Karosa had to be completely modernized, both in manufacturing and in the complete redesign of its buses.

In 1994 Karosa was bought by Renault. In 1995 the new Karosa 900 series started production.  This bus was the redesign of the 700 series. In 1999, Karosa became part of a pan-European venture holding company, Irisbus, which was founded by Renault and its Italian partner, Iveco. Iveco took over the whole Irisbus in 2003. Buses made in Karosa's Vysoké Mýto plant were sold in France, Italy, Germany, Finland, Switzerland, the Benelux countries, the Russian Federation and even in countries such as Guadeloupe in the Caribbean, Réunion Island in the Indian Ocean, Beirut and in Egypt.

Present
In 2007 Karosa's name was changed to Iveco Czech Republic. In 2013 the name was changed again and the company now produces buses under the name Iveco Bus. It is Europe's largest factory for the production of buses. Since 2005 the factory has produced the Irisbus Arway, Irisbus Récréo, and Irisbus Citelis, but now production is mainly focused on the Iveco Crossway and Iveco Urbanway buses.

Gallery

References

Bus manufacturers of the Czech Republic
Motor vehicle manufacturers of Czechoslovakia